Events from the year 1971 in Jordan.

Incumbents
Monarch: Hussein 
Prime Minister: Wasfi al-Tal (until 29 November), Ahmad al-Lawzi (starting 29 November)

Events

 Black September in Jordan

See also

 Years in Iraq
 Years in Syria
 Years in Saudi Arabia

References

 
1970s in Jordan
Jordan
Jordan
Years of the 20th century in Jordan